Calum Ferrie (born 16 June 1998) is an English professional footballer who plays as a goalkeeper for  club Queen's Park.

A former youth team player at Port Vale, he played on loan at Gresley in 2015 before he turned professional at Dundee the following year. He made his first-team debut for Dundee in April 2018. He joined Stirling Albion on loan in June 2018 and went on to be named as the club's Player of the Year for the 2018–19 season. He joined Falkirk on loan in January 2020. Ferrie would return to Dundee the following the season, and would start a few more games before leaving the club in 2021. He subsequently signed with Queen's Park and helped the club to win promotion out of Scottish League One via the play-offs in 2022.

Career

Port Vale
Ferrie was a youth-team player at Port Vale, when he moved on loan to Northern Premier League Division One South side Gresley in October 2015. He made his debut for Gresley in an FA Trophy qualification match at Matlock Town on 31 October. He featured in three further games for the club, his final appearance coming against Market Drayton Town on 28 November.

Dundee
After leaving Port Vale, Ferrie signed for Dundee in 2016. He made his senior debut in the Scottish Premiership in a 4–0 defeat away to Rangers on 7 April 2018. He appeared as a substitute for the injured Elliot Parish, and was praised by manager Neil McCann. After the match, Ferrie described himself as being "numb", and said that he wished to play more first-team games.

Ferrie was loaned to Scottish League Two club Stirling Albion in June 2018. He made 28 appearances for the Binos during the 2018–19 season. His efforts for the club were rewarded by being named both Stirling's Young Player of the Year and Player of the Year.

Ferrie signed a one-year extension with Dundee on 15 May 2019. He was sent out on loan to Scottish League One side Falkirk on 31 January 2020, after signing another one-year extension with the "Dark Blues".

Ferrie earned his first league start for Dundee in three seasons on 24 October 2020, earning his first win and clean sheet for the club in a 1–0 win over Greenock Morton at Dens Park. However Adam Legzdins was signed the following month, whilst number one Jack Hamilton returned to fitness, and Ferrie made just two further appearances in the 2020–21 campaign. He was on the bench for the play-off final win over Kilmarnock as Dundee secured promotion back into the Premiership, and was released upon the expiry of his contract in June.

Queen's Park 
In July 2021, Ferrie signed for Scottish League One side Queen's Park as head coach Laurie Ellis looked to provide competition to established number one Willie Muir. Ferrie would become the Spiders' starting goalkeeper midway through the 2021–22 season under new manager Owen Coyle, and would enjoy his second successive promotion as Queen's Park won the Championship play-offs in May 2022 by beating Airdrieonians 3–2 on aggregate after extra-time. At the end of a successful debut season, Ferrie would agree to extend his contract with the club until 2024.

Career statistics

Honours
Individual
Stirling Albion F.C. Player of the Year: 2018–19

Dundee
Scottish Championship play-offs: 2021

Queen's Park
Scottish League One play-offs: 2022

References

1998 births
Sportspeople from Shrewsbury
Living people
English footballers
Association football goalkeepers
Port Vale F.C. players
Gresley F.C. players
Dundee F.C. players
Stirling Albion F.C. players
Falkirk F.C. players
Queen's Park F.C. players
Northern Premier League players
Scottish Professional Football League players